The head of the government of France has been called the prime minister of France (French: Premier ministre) since 1959, when Michel Debré became the first officeholder appointed under the Fifth Republic. During earlier periods of history, the head of government of France was known by different titles. As was common in European democracies of the 1815–1958 period (the Bourbon Restoration and July Monarchy, the Second, Third, and Fourth Republic, as well as the Vichy regime), the head of government was called President of the Council of Ministers, generally shortened to President of the council. This should not be confused with the elected office of president of the French Republic, who appoints the prime minister as head of state.

9th century – 18th century

Kingdom of France (843–1792) 

Under the Kingdom of France, there was no official title for the leader of the government. The chief ministers (principal ministres) of certain kings of France nonetheless led the government de facto.

18th century – 19th century

French First Republic (1792–1804) 

During the First Republic, the arrangements for governance changed frequently:

National Convention (20 September 1792 – 2 November 1795)
 with Jérôme Pétion de Villeneuve as President of the National Convention (22 September 1792 – 2 June 1793)
 with Maximilien Robespierre as President of the National Convention (4 June 1793 – 27 July 1794)
 with Jean Jacques Régis de Cambacérès as President of the National Convention (7 October 1794 – 20 April 1795)
 with Emmanuel Joseph Sieyès as President of the National Convention (20 April 1795 – 26 October 1795)
Directory (2 November 1795 – 10 November 1799), with Paul Barras as President of the Directory
Consulate (10 November 1799 – 18 May 1804), with Napoleon Bonaparte as First Consul of France

There was no individual head of government.

French First Empire (1804–1815) 

As Emperor, Napoleon was both head of state and head of government.

First Restoration (1814–1815)

Hundred Days (1815) 

As Emperor, Napoleon was both head of state and head of government. Upon Napoleon's abdication, his son Napoleon II was named Emperor. This rule was nominal, and Napoleon II remained in Austria throughout his nominal reign.

Bourbon Restoration (1815–1830)

Presidents of the Council of Ministers

July Monarchy (1830–1848)

Presidents of the Council of Ministers 
Political parties

Second French Republic (1848–1852)

Presidents of the Council of Ministers

Second French Empire (1852–1870)

Cabinet Chiefs

19th century – 20th century

French Third Republic (1870–1940)

President of the Government of National Defense

Presidents of the Council of Ministers

French State (1940–1944) 

Until 1942, Marshal Philippe Pétain served as Chief of State and nominal President of the Council of Ministers: the vice-president of the Council of Ministers was the de facto head of government. From 1942, Pétain remained Chief of State, but Pierre Laval was named Chief of the Government.

Vice-Presidents of the Council of Ministers

Provisional Government of the French Republic (1944–1946)

Chairmen of the Provisional Government

Fourth French Republic (1946–1958)

Presidents of the Council of Ministers

20th century – 21st century

Fifth French Republic (since 1958)

Prime Ministers

See also 
 Chief Minister of France
 History of France
 Ministry for Europe and Foreign Affairs
 Politics of France
 President of France
 List of presidents of France

Notes

External links 
 List on the website of the French Prime Minister (in French)

Prime Ministers of

France